Bay of Quinte Yacht Club is a boating club based in Belleville, Ontario, Canada, located on the shores of the Bay of Quinte. It was founded in 1876 and unsuccessfully challenged for the America's Cup in 1881.

References

External links
 BQYC official site
BQYC slideshow on Flickr
BQYC on YouTube

America's Cup yacht clubs
Yacht clubs in Canada
1876 establishments in Ontario
Cultural infrastructure completed in 1876